Babak "Bob" Rafei is an Iranian video game art director, character animator and concept artist. He is the CEO of Big Red Button Entertainment, a video game development studio he co-founded with Jeff Lander in 2009.

Rafei is also an advisory board member for Game Developers Conference and Game Developers Choice Awards, as well as panel leader of Academy of Interactive Arts and Sciences's achievement awards category on Art Direction and contributing writer of Animation Magazine and Animation World Network.

A graduate of Parson's School of Design, Rafei was an employee of Naughty Dog, joining them in early 1995 to work on Crash Bandicoot. Other notable works include Jak and Daxter, Uncharted: Drake’s Fortune, and Sonic Boom: Rise of Lyric.

Rafei previously worked on album cover arts for A&M Records, most notably Blues Traveler's Travelers and Thieves.

Games
As art director
 Crash Bandicoot (1996)
 Crash Bandicoot 2: Cortex Strikes Back (1997)
 Crash Bandicoot: Warped (1998)
 Crash Team Racing (1999)
 Jak and Daxter: The Precursor Legacy (2001)
 Jak II (2003)
 Jak 3 (2004)
 Jak X: Combat Racing (2005)
 Uncharted: Drake's Fortune (2007)

As game director

 Sonic Boom: Rise of Lyric (2014)

References

External links
Official Website

1969 births
Parsons School of Design alumni
Iranian art directors
Iranian emigrants to the United States
Iranian people in the video game industry
Video game artists
Living people
American illustrators
American animators
Journalists from New York City
Iranian illustrators
Iranian animators
Iranian journalists
Naughty Dog people